The Tram in Khabarovsk is the primary transportation in Khabarovsk, Russia.  The first section opened on 5 November 1956. The last time the network was expanded in 1979. Today, the Khabarovsk Tram network consists of 4 operating routes.

List of routes

1. Chemical Pharmaceutical Factory – Khabarovsk Railway Station

2. Khabarovsk Railway Station – Ruberoidnyi zavod

5. Kirov Town – Khabarovsk Railway Station

6. No.19 School – Lazo District

See also

 List of town tramway systems in Russia

References

External links

Khabarovsk
Khabarovsk